George Steuart may refer to:

 George Steuart (architect) (1730–1806), Scottish architect
 George H. Steuart (brigadier general) (1828–1903), American Civil War general
 George H. Steuart (militia general) (1790–1867), militia general who saw action in the War of 1812
 George H. Steuart (politician) (1700–1784), Maryland politician and planter
 George H. Steuart (diplomat) (1907–1998), one of the last consuls of the United States at Liverpool, England
 George H. Steuart (physician) (1865–1945), physician from Maryland

Company
George Steuart Group, Sri Lanka's oldest commerce establishment

See also
 George Steuart Hume (1747–1788), physician, born George H. Steuart
 George Stuart (disambiguation)
 George Stewart (disambiguation)